Primary mediastinal (thymic) large B-cell lymphoma is a distinct type of diffuse large B-cell lymphoma involving the mediastinum, recognized in the WHO 2008 classification.

Signs and symptoms
Superior vena cava syndrome occurs in 30–50%, and pleural or pericardial effusions occur in about one-third.

Pathophysiology
PMLBCL arises from a putative thymic peripheral B cell. It has several distinctive biological features. Molecular analysis shows that PMLBCL is distinct from other types of diffuse large B-cell lymphomas (DLBCL). MAL gene expression is seen in 70%, unlike other diffuse large B-cell lymphomas. Gene expression profiling shows considerable variance from other DLBCLs and similarity to Hodgkin disease.

PMLBCL is CD20 positive, expresses pan-B markers including CD79a, and has clonal immunoglobulin gene rearrangements and mRNA but paradoxically does not express cytoplasmic or cell surface immunoglobulin.

Clinically, PMLBCL is unusual in several respects. Despite 80% PMLBCL being stage I or II, the presenting anterior mediastinal mass is often over 10 cm and is locally invasive of lung, chest wall, pleura, and pericardium. At initial presentation, PMLBCL is usually confined to mediastinum, but its bulk, rather than additional adenopathy, can sometimes be palpated at the low neck. Increased LDH is seen in approximately 75%, but unlike other large cell lymphomas, no increase in beta-2 microglobulin is seen even when bulky which may relate to defective major histocompatibility complex expression.

Treatment
Multiagent chemotherapy is recommended, but the preferred regimen is controversial, as is consolidative radiotherapy.

Epidemiology
It affects primarily young adults; the median age is 37 years. It is more common in females.

Grey zone lymphoma

"In-between CHD and NHL"

See also 
 Lymphoma
 Diffuse large B cell lymphoma

References

External links 

Lymphoma